The Ocean Electric Railway was a street car line that operated on The Rockaways. It ran parallel to parts of the Rockaway Beach Branch and Far Rockaway Branch of the Long Island Rail Road. The headquarters of the OER were at the Far Rockaway Long Island Rail Road station which was then located across Mott Avenue from the existing Far Rockaway–Mott Avenue subway station.  The Office of Superintendent - Trolleys at that location managed all the LIRR's owned trolley operations.

History

Rockaway Village Railroad
The Ocean Electric Railway originated as the replacement for the Rockaway Village Railroad, a horse car line constructed by local businessmen. Like the RVR it was a Street Railway. It was chartered on April 28, 1897, although trolley services on the Rockaway Peninsula date as far back as 1881.

Far Rockaway Railroad
On March 18, 1898, the LIRR bought the Far Rockaway Railroad, a 1.1 mile horse-car line, and integrated it into the Ocean Electric.

LIRR ownership
The purpose of the system was to create a rapid-transit link between the New York and Rockaway Beach Railroad, and the Far Rockaway Branch, formerly owned by the South Side Railroad of Long Island. Both were steam-operated railroads and required a quick connection, although electrification of the Rockaway Beach Branch began on July 26, 1905, and electrification of the Far Rockaway Branch began on December 11, 1905

In June 1904, a third (middle) track was built between Far Rockaway and Hammels and trolley cars began running in the street from Fairview Avenue, Hammels to Rockaway Park.  

Between 1905 and 1911, the LIRR began the transition from overhead wires to third rail power collection cars for the OER on the portions of track it shared with the LIRR's suburban trains between Far Rockaway and Hammels. In October 1905, the LIRR's outside tracks were fitted with third rails and electric train service began to Far Rockaway. Beginning in 1910, third rail was installed on the middle track for the new Pennsylvania Station service. Third rail shoes were on the trolley cars and in 1911 the system ceased to run on overhead wires. Ocean Electric Service was extended to Belle Harbor at Pelham Avenue (now Beach 126th Street) in 1915, and Neponsit at Beach 149th Street on June 8, 1916, unlike the Long Island Rail Road which only went as far as Rockaway Park.

With the exception of those west of Rockaway Park Station and those on Rockaway Beach Boulevard between Arverne and Rockaway Park, most trolley stops were shared with Long Island Railroad stations. Others, such as Frank Avenue Station became LIRR stations in 1922. As trolley service began to decline at the end of World War I, the LIRR prepared to remove involvement with trolleys. The Roche's Beach Branch was abandoned in 1924, the segment east of Hammels was abandoned in 1926, and the remaining section was abandoned in 1928.

Lines

References

General References
"The Long Island Rail Road: A Comprehensive History Volume #5 (New York, Woodhaven & Rockaway Railroad; New York & Rockaway Beach railway; New York & Long Beach Railroad; New York & Rockaway railroad; Brooklyn rapid transit operation to Rockaway; Over L.I.R.R.)", by Vincent F. Seyfried

External links
Ocean Electric Railway (Arrt's Arrchives)
Far Rockaway Railroad (Arrt's Arrchives)
1923 Map of the Borough of Queens
The East Wind; May 2015; Pages 23-27

1897 establishments in New York City
1928 disestablishments in New York (state)
Streetcar lines in Queens, New York
Railway companies established in 1897
Railway companies disestablished in 1928
Defunct public transport operators in the United States
Defunct New York (state) railroads
Companies affiliated with the Long Island Rail Road
Transportation in Rockaway, Queens
Railroad lines in Rockaway, Queens